is a Japanese former ice dancer. She regularly danced with Akiyuki Kido. They are the three time Japanese national champions. They placed 15th at the Torino Olympics.

Results
GP: Champions Series / Grand Prix

 with Kido

External links

 
 Official Site (in Japanese)

1971 births
People from Ōta, Tokyo
Living people
Japanese female ice dancers
Olympic figure skaters of Japan
Figure skaters at the 2006 Winter Olympics
Sportspeople from Tokyo
Asian Games medalists in figure skating
Figure skaters at the 1999 Asian Winter Games
Figure skaters at the 2003 Asian Winter Games
Figure skaters at the 2007 Asian Winter Games

Medalists at the 2003 Asian Winter Games
Medalists at the 2007 Asian Winter Games
Asian Games gold medalists for Japan
Asian Games silver medalists for Japan
International Christian University alumni
Competitors at the 1999 Winter Universiade